Langley Regional Airport  is located in Langley Township, British Columbia, Canada. It serves mostly general aviation, and also provided scheduled passenger service to the Victoria Airport Water Aerodrome via Harbour Air Seaplanes before service was ended on May 20, 2011. Helicopter operations are a major part of Langley Airport's traffic; the airport has three helipads.

The airport offers fuel services and extensive hangar space, and hosts the Canadian Museum of Flight.

General information
These relatively short runways make it a good airport for flight training purposes because a pilot who trains on short runways is likely to be more capable. There is also a public road near each end of the paved runway (01/19) resulting in relatively short "Takeoff Distance Available" (TODA).

Due to the proximity of residential areas, runway 19 has a departure noise-abatement procedure that requires a 30-degree turn, and runway 25 has a departure noise-abatement procedure that requires a 50-degree turn.

Langley radio frequencies are 119.00 for the control tower, 124.50 for Automatic Terminal Information Service (ATIS), and 121.90 for ground service.

The airport is home to 54 businesses, including many helicopter operators and fixed-wing and rotary-wing flight training units. Consequently the airport has a high volume of training traffic.

History
In 1945, at the end of World War II, the township of Langley leased the former Royal Canadian Air Force airport from the federal government before purchasing the airport outright in 1967 for $24,300. Since then, the airport has been in continuous operation.

See also
 List of airports in the Lower Mainland

References

External links

Airport Authority website

Certified airports in British Columbia
Airports in Greater Vancouver
Transport in Langley, British Columbia (district municipality)